Subimal "Chuni" Goswami (15 January 1938 – 30 April 2020) was an Indian professional footballer and first-class cricketer. As footballer, he played as a striker or winger, captained both the Mohun Bagan club and the India national team. He also served as the Sheriff of Kolkata. Goswami scored nine goals in 30 international appearances. He was an Olympian, represented India national team at the 1960 Summer Olympics. He also led the team to achieve the gold medal at the 1962 Asian Games, and earn the runners-up position at the 1964 AFC Asian Cup.

Playing for the India national team under coaching of Syed Abdul Rahim, Goswami was also a first class cricketer, playing Ranji Trophy for Bengal. He captained his team to the final of the tournament in 1971–72. On 15 January 2020, India Post issued a commemorative postage stamp in his honour. Goswami's autobiography Khelte Khelte was published in 1982.

Personal life
Born in Kishoreganj, Bengal Presidency, Goswami moved to Calcutta and settled there in his childhood. His elder brother Manik Goswami was also a footballer who played for George Telegraph. Goswami was married to Basanti and gave birth to their son, named Sudipto.

Football career

Chuni Goswami holds the distinction of playing for a single club, Mohun Bagan, throughout his club career despite numerous offers from other clubs including one reported offer from Tottenham Hotspur.

Club career
Goswami joined the Mohun Bagan junior team in 1946 at the age of 8 years. He was a part of the junior squad up to 1954 and then graduated to the Mohun Bagan senior team. Mentored by club legend Balaidas Chatterjee, Goswami went on to represent Mohun Bagan in various foreign tours. He made his club debut on 29 May in the same year in Mohun Bagan's 3–0 win against Eastern Railway, in which he scored a goal. In the 1959 CFL season, Goswami scored 14 goals for his team. He continued playing for Mohun Bagan until his retirement in 1968. In the 1960s, Goswami and Jarnail Singh became two highest-paid players of the club; both of them captained the team respectively. Goswami captained Mohun Bagan in five seasons from 1960 to 1964. During his stay at the club, he won the Calcutta Football League six times, IFA Shield and Durand Cup four times.

International career
Chuni Goswami made his international debut for India in 1956 during the team's 1–0 victory over the Chinese Olympic team. He went on to play for India in 50 international matches including in Olympics, Asian Games, Asia Cup and Merdeka Cup. He captained India to the Asian Games Gold Medal in 1962 and a Silver in the 1964 AFC Asian Cup in Tel Aviv and in the Merdeka Cup. Goswami, known for having incredible partnership with P. K. Banerjee and Tulsidas Balaram, is one of the "Indian football's holy trinity".

Career statistics

International statistics

Chuni Goswami played in 30 FIFA "A" international matches having scored 9 times for the National team.

International goals

Honours
Mohun Bagan
Durand Cup: 1959, 1960, 1963, 1964, 1965
IFA Shield: 1960, 1961, 1962, 1967
Rovers Cup: 1966
Calcutta Football League: 1959, 1960, 1962, 1963, 1964, 1965

India
Asian Games Gold medal: 1962
AFC Asian Cup runners-up: 1964
Merdeka Tournament runner-up: 1964

Bengal
 Santosh Trophy: 1955–56, 1958–59

Individual
 Mohun Bagan Ratna Award: 2001
 Banga Bibhushan: 2013

Records
Top goal scorer of Calcutta Football League (with 145 goals)

Cricket career

Chuni Goswami made his first class debut for Bengal in the Ranji Trophy during the 1962–63 season. He was a Right Handed Batsman and a Right Arm Medium Pacer. After retiring from football, Goswami fully focussed on playing cricket for West Bengal. He appeared in two Ranji Trophy finals, losing to Mumbai each time. In the 1968–69 final, he scored 96 and 84; but Ajit Wadekar's century helped Mumbai win on first innings lead. Later, he led the Bengal cricket team to a 1972 Ranji Trophy final which they lost to Mumbai for whom Gavaskar and Shivalkar starred. Playing for Combined East and Central Zone team against the touring West Indies side in December 1966, Chuni Goswami took 8 wickets in the match as his team surprisingly beat the tourists by an innings. In his cricket career, which spanned up to the 1972–73 season, he played 46 first class matches, scoring 1,592 runs with one century and seven fifties, and took 47 wickets.

Managerial career
Goswami later became team official of Mohun Bagan and went with Karuna Bhattacharya managed team to newly independent Bangladesh in May 1972, where they defeated Dhaka Mohammedan in first match, but lost to Shadhin Bangla football team in their last match. He later became director of Tata Football Academy in 1986, and also managed India national football team in 1991–92.

Death
Goswami died on 30 April 2020 at the age of 82 in Kolkata after a prolonged illness. For the last few months, Goswami was suffering from underlying ailments with diabetes, prostate infection and neurological problems. His family confirmed that Goswami was admitted to a city hospital earlier in the day and died at 5 pm after a cardiac arrest.

Awards
Goswami won numerous awards during his playing career as well as after retirement for his contribution towards Indian football. The prominent awards won by him are:
 1958 – Best Footballer Award by Kolkata Veterans Sports Club
 1962 – Best Striker of Asia Award
 1963 – Arjuna award
 1983 –  Padma Shri award
 2005 – Mohan Bagan Ratna

See also 

 List of one-club men in association football
 List of India national football team captains
 History of the India national football team
 Football at the Asian Games
 India national football team at the Olympics

References

Bibliography

External links
 
 Details at RSSSF

1938 births
2020 deaths
Indian footballers
India international footballers
Footballers from Kolkata
Cricketers from Kolkata
Indian cricketers
People from Kishoreganj District
Bengal cricketers
Recipients of the Arjuna Award
Sheriffs of Kolkata
Olympic footballers of India
Footballers at the 1956 Summer Olympics
Footballers at the 1960 Summer Olympics
1964 AFC Asian Cup players
Recipients of the Padma Shri in sports
Asutosh College alumni
University of Calcutta alumni
Mohun Bagan AC players
East Zone cricketers
State Bank of India cricketers
Asian Games medalists in football
Footballers at the 1958 Asian Games
Footballers at the 1962 Asian Games
Association football forwards
Asian Games gold medalists for India
Medalists at the 1962 Asian Games
Calcutta Football League players